La Cruz is one of the 67 municipalities of Chihuahua, in northern Mexico. The municipal seat lies at La Cruz. The municipality covers an area of 1,035.9 km².

As of 2010, the municipality had a total population of 3,982, up from 3,844 as of 2005. 

As of 2010, the town of La Cruz had a population of 1,671. Other than the town of La Cruz, the municipality had 65 localities, none of which had a population over 1,000.

Geography

Towns and villages
The municipality has 27 localities. The largest are:

References

Municipalities of Chihuahua (state)